Go Go Harlem Baby is an album by the American punkabilly band Flat Duo Jets. It was released via Sky in 1991. 

The album was reissued by Third Man Records in 2011.

Production
Recorded at Easley McCain Recording, the album was produced by Jim Dickinson. The majority of Go Go Harlem Baby was recorded in three days. "You Belong to Me" is a cover of the Duprees' song; "Apple Blossom Time" is a cover of the standard made popular by the Andrews Sisters.

Critical reception

Trouser Press wrote that "the ultra-live sound of the speedballs renders some of them generic, although [Dexter] Romweber continues to excel on the slower cuts, offering an atmospheric reading of the instrumental classic 'Harlem Nocturne'." Spin called Romweber "the Crispin Glover of rock'n'roll singers," writing that he emotes "with a creepy edge that Jerry Lee Lewis himself would be hard-pressed to match." 

The Orlando Sentinel thought that "for a rock 'n' roll animal, Romweber has an amazingly pretty voice." The Washington Post opined that "wild-eyed, gravel-voiced singer/songwriter/guitarist Dexter Romweber remains an original, his genius and his preposterousness inextricably linked." 

AllMusic wrote that the band's "deliciously dirty and rough brand of rockabilly is unrivaled, and this disc is perhaps their finest."

Track listing

Personnel
Dexter Romweber - guitar, vocals
Chris "Crow" Smith - drums

References

1991 albums
Albums produced by Jim Dickinson